Never Forget You may refer to:

 "Never Forget You" (Mariah Carey song), 1994
 "Never Forget You" (Noisettes song), 2009
 "Never Forget You" (Zara Larsson and MNEK song), 2015

See also
 Never Forget (disambiguation)
 Never Forget Me, a 1976 South Korean film
 I'll Never Forget You (disambiguation)
 Won't Forget You (disambiguation)